Ain Qannas or Ein Ganas is an archaeological site located near Al-Murah village in Al-Hasa, Eastern Saudi Arabia. It dates to the period between late 6th to early 5th millennium. The site is related to Ubaid period, which is Arabian Neolithic period.

Description 
The site is approximately 60 kilometers from the coast, at the time it was located by the shores of a lake. The site is at a mound, that is 4 m high and 250 m across. It contains multi-storied residential units with evidence of slave culture that evolved in the site. The stratigraphy indicated abrupt climatic fluctuation with moist and dry periods alternating. In upper stratigraphic levels, fragments of pottery were found. Also there were evidence of hunting of equids and herding of goats and cattle. Also blade-type tools with projectile points and scrapers were found.

By the end of slave era (Ubaid period), before 5,550 years ago, the civilized era began in Mesopotamia where commercial and cultural contacts between the civilizations around the Persian Gulf has thrived.

References 

Archaeological sites in Saudi Arabia
Ubaid period